Damn Country Music is the fourteenth studio album by American country music artist Tim McGraw. It was produced by McGraw and Byron Gallimore.  The album was released on November 6, 2015, by Big Machine Records. Its lead single, "Top of the World", was released on August 4, 2015.  The title track, "Damn Country Music", was released on October 9, 2015 as part of the album pre-order.

Content
The album features a duet with McGraw's oldest daughter Gracie titled "Here Tonight", while Big & Rich perform on the song "California." Big & Rich later released their own version of the song as a single in March 2017. "Don't Make Me Feel At Home" was previously recorded by Wesley Dennis in 1995.

Promotion

Singles
The first single of the album, "Top of the World" was released on August 4, 2015. It debuted at number 30 on the Hot Country Songs chart. The next week it debut at number 18 on the Country Digital Songs chart, selling 16,000 copies. The second single of the album, "Humble and Kind" was released on February 1, 2016. The third single of the album, "How I'll Always Be" released on July 11, 2016.

Commercial performance
The album debuted at No. 5 on the Billboard 200 upon its release, and No. 3 on the Top Country Albums chart, selling 39,300 copies in its first week. As of March 2017 the album has sold 255,800 copies in the United States.

Track listing

Personnel

Musicians and singers

 Tim McGraw – lead vocals
 Jamie Muhoberac – keyboards (1-7, 9, 10, 12, 13, 14)
 Jeff Roach – keyboards (1, 2, 4, 6, 7, 14)
 Steve Nathan — keyboards (3, 6, 8, 9, 10, 12, 13), horns (12)
 Byron Gallimore –additional keyboards (2, 9), additional backing vocals (7)
 David Dorn – additional keyboards (5, 11)
 David Levita – electric guitar
 Rusty Anderson – electric guitar (1, 2, 4, 6, 7, 9, 10, 14), additional acoustic guitar (1)
 Michael Landau – electric guitar (1-10, 12, 13, 14)
 Danny Rader — acoustic guitar (1, 2, 4, 7, 14), banjo (1), mandolin (1), bouzouki (2, 7, 14)
 Justin Schipper – pedal steel guitar
 Troy Lancaster – electric guitar (3, 5, 8, 11, 12, 13)
 Ilya Toshinsky – acoustic guitar (3, 5, 6, 8-11, 13)
 Paul Bushnell – bass 
 Shannon Forrest – drums, drum programming 
 Eric Darken – percussion (1)
 Larry Franklin – fiddle (8)
 Greg Barnhill – backing vocals (1-9, 11-14)
 Gracie McGraw – lead vocals (1)
 Big & Rich – lead and backing vocals (10)

Strings on "Humble and Kind"
 Stephen Lamb — music copyist
 Carole Rabinowitz – cello
 Sara Sant'Ambrogio – cello
 Kristin Wilkinson – viola, string arrangements
 David Angell – violin
 David Davidson – violinStrings on "Kiss a Girl" David Campbell – arrangements and conductor 
 Suzie Katayama – contractor
 Mike Valerio – acoustic bass 
 Dane Little, Steve Richards and Rudy Stein – cello 
 Andrew Duckles, Matt Funes and Luke Maurer – viola 
 Charlie Bisharat, Jackie Brand, Mario DeLeon, Songa Lee, Natalie Leggett, Serena McKinney, Joel Pargman, Sara Parkins, Michele Richards and Josefina Vergara – violin 

Production

 Byron Gallimore – producer, mixing (2-9, 11-14)
 Tim McGraw — producer
 Missi Gallimore – A&R
 Julian King — engineer
 Chris Lord-Alge – mixing (1, 10)
 Stephen Allbritten – additional engineer (1-4, 6-10, 12-14), mix assistant (2-9, 11-14)
 Adam Chagnon – additional engineer (1, 10)
 Erik Lutkins – additional engineer (1-4, 6-10, 12-14), mix assistant (2-9, 11-14)
 Ernesto Olvera – assistant engineer (1-4, 6-10, 12-14)
 Jake Burns – assistant engineer (5, 11)
 Nik Karpen – mix assistant (1, 10)
 Adam Ayan – mastering 
 Becky Reiser – art production
 Liam Ward – art production
 Kelly Clague – creative director
 Sandi Spika Borchetta – creative director
 Nick Egan – art direction, design
 Danny Clinch – photographyStudios''' 
 Tracks 1-4, 6-10 & 12-14 recorded at Blackbird Studios (Nashville, TN).
 Tracks 5 & 11 recorded at Black River Soundstage (Nashville, TN).
 Tracks 1 & 10 mixed at Mix LA (Los Angeles, CA).
 Tracks 2-9 & 11-14 mixed at Essential Sound Studios (Franklin, TN).
 Mastered at Gateway Mastering (Portland, ME).

Charts

Weekly charts

Year-end charts

Certifications

Release history

References

2015 albums
Tim McGraw albums
Big Machine Records albums
Albums produced by Byron Gallimore
Albums produced by Tim McGraw